Cachexia is a complex syndrome associated with an underlying illness, causing ongoing muscle loss that is not entirely reversed with nutritional supplementation. A range of diseases can cause cachexia, most commonly cancer, congestive heart failure, chronic obstructive pulmonary disease, chronic kidney disease, and AIDS. Systemic inflammation from these conditions can cause detrimental changes to metabolism and body composition. In contrast to weight loss from inadequate caloric intake, cachexia causes mostly muscle loss instead of fat loss. Diagnosis of cachexia can be difficult due to the lack of well-established diagnostic criteria. Cachexia can improve with treatment of the underlying illness but other treatment approaches have limited benefit. Cachexia is associated with increased mortality and poor quality of life.

The term is from Greek κακός kakos 'bad' and ἕξις hexis 'condition'.

Causes
Cachexia can be caused by diverse medical conditions, but is most often associated with end-stage cancer, known as cancer cachexia. About 50% of all cancer patients develop cachexia. Those with upper gastrointestinal and pancreatic cancers have the highest frequency of developing a cachexic symptom. Prevalence of cachexia rises in more advanced stages and is estimated to affect 80% of terminal cancer patients.

Congestive heart failure, AIDS, chronic obstructive pulmonary disease, and chronic kidney disease are other conditions that often cause cachexia. Cachexia can also be the result of advanced stages of cystic fibrosis, multiple sclerosis, motor neuron disease, Parkinson's disease, dementia, tuberculosis, multiple system atrophy, mercury poisoning, Crohn's disease, trypanosomiasis, rheumatoid arthritis, and celiac disease as well as other systemic diseases.

Mechanism
The exact mechanism in which these diseases cause cachexia is poorly understood, and likely is multifactorial with multiple disease pathways involved. Inflammatory cytokines appear to play a central role including tumor necrosis factor (TNF) (which is also nicknamed 'cachexin' or 'cachectin'), interferon gamma and interleukin 6. TNF has been shown to have a direct catabolic effect on skeletal muscle and adipose tissue through the ubiquitin proteasome pathway. This mechanism involves the formation of reactive oxygen species leading to upregulation of the transcription factor NF-κB. NF-κB is a known regulator of the genes that encode cytokines and cytokine receptors. The increased production of cytokines induces proteolysis and breakdown of myofibrillar proteins. Systemic inflammation also causes reduced protein synthesis through inhibition of the Akt/mTOR pathway.

Although many different tissues and cell types may be responsible for the increase in circulating cytokines, evidence indicates tumors themselves are an important source of factors that may promote cachexia in cancer. Tumor-derived molecules such as lipid mobilizing factor, proteolysis-inducing factor, and mitochondrial uncoupling proteins may induce protein degradation and contribute to cachexia. Uncontrolled inflammation in cachexia can lead to an elevated resting metabolic rate, further increasing the demands for protein and energy sources.

There is also evidence of alteration in feeding control loops in cachexia. High levels of leptin, a hormone secreted by adipocytes, block the release of neuropeptide Y, which is the most potent feeding-stimulatory peptide in the hypothalamic orexigenic network, leading to decreased energy intake despite the high metabolic demand for nutrients.

Diagnosis
Diagnostic guidelines and criteria have only recently been proposed despite the prevalence of cachexia and varying criteria, the primary features of cachexia include progressive depletion of muscle and fat mass, reduced food intake, abnormal metabolism of carbohydrate, protein, and fat, reduced quality of life, and increased physical impairment.

Historically, body weight changes were used as the primary metrics of cachexia, including low body mass index and involuntary weight loss of more than 10%. Using weight alone is limited by the presence of edema, tumor mass and the high prevalence of obesity in the general population. Weight-based criteria do not take into account changes in body composition, especially loss of lean body mass.

In the attempt to include a broader evaluation of the burden of cachexia, diagnostic criteria using assessments of laboratory metrics and symptoms in addition to weight have been proposed. The criteria included weight loss of at least 5% in 12 months or low body mass index (less than 22  kg/m2) with at least three of the following features: decreased muscle strength, fatigue, anorexia, low fat‐free mass index, or abnormal biochemistry (increased inflammatory markers, anemia, low serum albumin). In cancer patients, cachexia is diagnosed from unintended weight loss of more than 5%. For cancer patients with a body mass index of less than 20  kg/m2, cachexia is diagnosed after the unintended weight loss of more than 2%. Additionally, it can be diagnosed through sarcopenia, or loss of skeletal muscle mass.

Laboratory markers are used in evaluation of people with cachexia, including albumin, prealbumin, C-reactive protein, or hemoglobin. However, laboratory metrics and cut-off values are not standardized across different diagnostic criteria. Acute phase reactants (IL-6, IL-1b, tumor necrosis factor-a, IL-8, interferon-g) are sometimes measured but correlate poorly with outcomes. There are no biomarkers to identify people with cancer who may develop cachexia.

In the effort to better classify cachexia severity, several scoring systems have been proposed including the Cachexia Staging Score (CSS) and Cachexia Score (CASCO). The CSS takes into account weight loss, subjective reporting of muscle function, performance status, appetite loss, and laboratory changes to categorize patients into non-cachexia, pre-cachexia, cachexia, and refractory cachexia. The Cachexia SCOre (CASCO) is another validated score that includes evaluation of body weight loss and composition, inflammation, metabolic disturbances, immunosuppression, physical performance, anorexia, and quality of life.

Evaluation of changes in body composition is limited by the difficulty in measuring muscle mass and health in a non-invasive and cost-effective way. Imaging with quantification of muscle mass has been investigated including bioelectrical impedance analysis, computed tomography, dual-energy X-ray absorptiometry (DEXA), and magnetic resonance imaging but are not widely used.

Definition
Identification, treatment, and research of cachexia have historically been limited by the lack of a widely accepted definition of cachexia. In 2011, an international consensus group adopted a definition of cachexia as "a multifactorial syndrome defined by an ongoing loss of skeletal muscle mass (with or without loss of fat mass) that can be partially but not entirely reversed by conventional nutritional support."

Cachexia differs from weight loss due to malnutrition from malabsorption, anorexia nervosa, or anorexia due to major depressive disorder. Weight loss from inadequate caloric intake generally causes fat loss before muscle loss, whereas cachexia causes predominantly muscle wasting. Cachexia is also distinct from sarcopenia, or age-related muscle loss, although they often co-exist.

Treatment

The management of cachexia depends on the underlying cause, the general prognosis, and the needs of the person affected. The most effective approach to cachexia is treating the underlying disease process. An example is the reduction in cachexia from AIDS by highly active antiretroviral therapy. However this is often not possible or maybe inadequate to reverse the cachexia syndrome in other diseases. Approaches to mitigate muscle loss include exercise, nutritional therapies, and medications.

Exercise

Therapy that includes regular physical exercise can be recommended for the treatment of cachexia due to the positive effects of exercise on skeletal muscle but current evidence remains uncertain as to its effectiveness, acceptability and safety for cancer patients.  Individuals with cachexia generally report low levels of physical activity and few engage in an exercise routine, owing to low motivation to exercise and a belief that exercising may worsen their symptoms or cause harm.

Medications
Appetite stimulant medications are used to treat cachexia to increase food intake, but are not effective in stopping muscle wasting and may have detrimental side effects. Appetite stimulants include glucocorticoids, cannabinoids, or progestins such as megestrol acetate. Anti-emetics such as 5-HT3 antagonists are also commonly used in cancer cachexia if nausea is a prominent symptom.

Anabolic-androgenic steroids like oxandrolone may be beneficial in cachexia but their use is recommended for a maximum of two weeks since a longer duration of treatment increases side effects. Whilst preliminary studies have suggested thalidomide may be useful, a Cochrane review found no evidence to make an informed decision about the use of this drug in cancer patients with cachexia.

Nutrition
The increased metabolic rate and appetite suppression common in cachexia can compound muscle loss. Studies using a calorie-dense protein supplementation have suggested at least weight stabilization can be achieved, although improvements in lean body mass have not been observed in these studies.

Supplements 
Administration of exogenous amino acids have been investigated to serve as a protein-sparing metabolic fuel by providing substrates for both muscle metabolism and gluconeogenesis. The branched-chain amino acids leucine and valine may have potential in inhibiting overexpression of protein breakdown pathways. The amino acid glutamine has been used as a component of oral supplementation to reverse cachexia in people with advanced cancer or HIV/AIDS.

β-hydroxy β-methylbutyrate (HMB) is a metabolite of leucine that acts as a signaling molecule to stimulate protein synthesis. Studies showed positive results for chronic pulmonary disease, hip fracture, and in AIDS‐related and cancer‐related cachexia. However, many of these clinical studies used HMB as a component of combination treatment with glutamine, arginine, leucine, higher dietary protein and/or vitamins, which limits the assessment of the efficacy of HMB alone.

Epidemiology
Accurate epidemiological data on the prevalence of cachexia is lacking due to changing diagnostic criteria and under-identification of people with the disorder. It is estimated that cachexia from any disease is estimated to affect more than 5 million people in the United States. The prevalence of cachexia is growing and estimated at 1% of the population. The prevalence is lower in Asia but due to the larger population, represents a similar burden. Cachexia is also a significant problem in South America and Africa.

The most frequent causes of cachexia in the United States by population prevalence are: 1) chronic obstructive pulmonary disease (COPD), 2) heart failure, 3) cancer cachexia, 4) chronic kidney disease. The prevalence of cachexia ranges from 15 to 60% among people with cancer, increasing to an estimated 80% in terminal cancer. This wide range is attributed to differences in cachexia definition, variability in cancer populations, and timing of diagnosis. Although the prevalence of cachexia among people with COPD or heart failure is lower (estimated 5% to 20%), the large number of people with these conditions dramatically increases the total cachexia burden.

Cachexia contributes to significant loss of function and healthcare utilization. Estimates using the National Inpatient Sample in the United States suggest that cachexia accounted for 177,640 hospital stays in 2016. Cachexia is considered the immediate cause of death of many people with cancer, estimated between 22 and 40%.

History
The word "cachexia" is derived from the Greek words "Kakos" (bad) and "hexis" (condition). English ophthalmologist John Zachariah Laurence was the first to use the phrase "cancerous cachexia", doing so in 1858. He applied the phrase to the chronic wasting associated with malignancy. It was not until 2011 that the term "cancer-associated cachexia" was given a formal definition, with a publication by Kenneth Fearon. Fearon defined it as "a multifactorial syndrome characterized by ongoing loss of skeletal muscle (with or without loss of fat mass) that cannot be fully reversed by conventional nutritional support and leads to progressive functional impairment".

Research
Several medications are under investigation or have been previously trialed for use in cachexia but are currently not in widespread clinical use:

 Thalidomide
 Cytokine antagonists
 Cannabinoids 
 Omega-3 fatty acids, including eicosapentaenoic acid (EPA) 
 Non-steroidal anti-inflammatory drugs 
 Prokinetics  
 Ghrelin and ghrelin receptor agonist 
 Anabolic catabolic transforming agents such as MT-102 
 Selective androgen receptor modulators
 Cyproheptadine 
 Hydrazine

Medical marijuana has been allowed for the treatment of cachexia in some US states, such as Illinois, Maryland, Delaware, Nevada, Michigan, Washington, Oregon, California, Colorado, New Mexico, Arizona, Vermont, New Jersey, Rhode Island, Maine, and New York  Hawaii and Connecticut.

Multimodal therapy
Despite the extensive investigation into single therapeutic targets for cachexia, the most effective treatments use multi-targeted therapies. In Europe, a combination of non-drug approaches including physical training, nutritional counseling, and psychotherapeutic intervention are used in belief this approach may be more effective than monotherapy. Administration of anti-inflammatory drugs showed efficacy and safety in the treatment of people with advanced cancer  cachexia.

See also 
Sarcopenia
Muscle atrophy
Marasmus
Cancer
Progressive disease
 Journal of Cachexia, Sarcopenia and Muscle

References

External links 

Geriatrics
Rehabilitation medicine
Symptoms and signs: Endocrinology, nutrition, and metabolism